The 1872 South Australian football season was the tenth year of interclub football in South Australia.

Metropolitan inter-club matches 

 June 15 – Kensington (0) drew with Adelaide (0) (Crowd: 400)
 June 29 - Adelaide (4) def Port Adelaide (0) 
 July 13 – Adelaide (1) def Kensington (0)
 July 27 - Adelaide (0) drew with Port Adelaide (0)
 August 6 - Adelaide (1) def Kensington (0)
 September 7 – Adelaide (1) def Port Adelaide (0)

Ladder

References 

1872 in Australian sport
Australian rules football competition seasons
South Australian football season